Michael Imperioli (born March 26, 1966) is an American actor, writer, and musician. He is best known for his role as Christopher Moltisanti in the HBO crime drama The Sopranos (1999–2007), which earned him the Primetime Emmy Award for Outstanding Supporting Actor in a Drama Series in 2004. He gained recognition in the early part of his career for his role as Spider in Martin Scorsese's Goodfellas (1990). He has had supporting roles in films such as Jungle Fever (1991), Bad Boys (1995), The Basketball Diaries (1995), Shark Tale (2004) and The Lovely Bones (2009), as well as in the HBO drama series The White Lotus (2022–present).

Imperioli is also a screenwriter, co-writing the screenplay for Summer of Sam (1999) with Spike Lee, writing five episodes of The Sopranos, and writing as well as  directing the feature film The Hungry Ghosts (2008).

Early life
Imperioli was born in Mount Vernon, New York, a working class suburb of New York City. He is the son of Dan Imperioli, a bus driver and amateur actor, and Claire Imperioli, a department store worker and amateur actress. His ancestors immigrated to New York from Italy in the 1890s, from Lazio and Sicily. At age 11, Imperioli and his family moved to Brewster, New York, and in high school he began watching Broadway plays. After graduating from Brewster High School in 1983, Imperioli planned on studying pre-med at the State University of New York at Albany. The night before he was set to begin college he confided in his parents of his desire to be an actor. At age 17, Imperioli moved to Manhattan's East Village enrolling at Lee Strasberg Theatre and Film Institute to study acting. While at Lee Strasberg, he met John Ventimiglia who later portrayed Artie Bucco on The Sopranos, and the two became roommates.

Career

Imperioli has been nominated for two Golden Globe Awards and five Emmy Awards for his work as Christopher Moltisanti on The Sopranos. He won one Emmy for the fifth season of The Sopranos in 2004.

In addition to his role on The Sopranos, Imperioli has appeared in a number of films, including Goodfellas, Jungle Fever, Bad Boys, Malcolm X, The Basketball Diaries, Clockers, Dead Presidents, Girl 6, My Baby's Daddy, Lean on Me, I Shot Andy Warhol, Last Man Standing, Shark Tale, High Roller: The Stu Ungar Story, and Summer of Sam, which he also co-wrote and co-produced. He also wrote five episodes for The Sopranos.

Imperioli served as artistic director of Studio Dante, an Off-Broadway theater he formed with his wife. He is an active member of The Jazz Foundation of America and co-hosted their May 2009 annual benefit concert, "A Great Night in Harlem", at the Apollo Theater, which celebrated the foundation's 20th anniversary. He was a guest on the "San Giuseppe" episode of Mario Batali's Food Network television show Molto Mario. In 2010, Imperioli signed on to play the lead in the ABC television show Detroit 1-8-7. Working with the writer Gabriele Tinti, he wrote the text "Pride" for Tinti's book New York Shots, and participated in a reading of The Way of the Cross at the Queens Museum of Art in 2011.

Imperioli won the Tournament of Stars competition on the cooking show Chopped in 2014, sending $50,000 to his designated charity the Pureland Project, an organization which builds and maintains schools in rural Tibet. In 2016, he guest starred as the angel Uriel on the Fox show Lucifer.

On March 13, 2019, Imperioli was cast in the lead role of Rick Sellitto in the NBC drama series Lincoln Rhyme: Hunt for the Bone Collector. Imperioli co-hosts a podcast with Steve Schirripa titled Talking Sopranos, which began on April 6, 2020. The two provide inside info as they follow The Sopranos series episode by episode. By September 2020, the podcast had reached over five million downloads.

On September 17, 2020, Imperioli and Schirripa signed a deal with HarperCollins book imprint William Morrow and Company to write an oral history of the show; the book titled Woke Up This Morning: The Definitive Oral History of The Sopranos was released on November 2, 2021. In July 2020, he hosted a show on NTS Radio called 632 ELYSIAN FIELDS, which was inspired by A Streetcar Named Desire. In September 2020, Imperioli provided narration for The Whistleblower, a podcast about the 2007 NBA betting scandal.

Imperioli is the guitarist and vocalist for the band Zopa. In 2020, Zopa released their debut album entitled La Dolce Vita. In 2021, Zopa headlined the Freakout Festival in Seattle.

Imperioli had a narrator cameo in the 2021 Sopranos prequel film, The Many Saints of Newark.

In January 2022, Imperioli was cast in a lead role in the second season of the dark comedy series The White Lotus at HBO.

Personal life
Imperioli married Victoria Chlebowski in 1996. They have homes in the Upper West Side of Manhattan and in Santa Barbara, California, and have three children. He and his family are avid practitioners of Tae Kwon Do. In 2008, Imperioli became a Buddhist.

Filmography

Film

Television

Awards and nominations

References

External links
LA Yoga Magazine - Michael Imperioli; This Is The Way Of The Bodhisattva
 

1966 births
20th-century American male actors
21st-century American male actors
American Buddhists
American male film actors
American male television actors
Converts to Buddhism
Outstanding Performance by a Supporting Actor in a Drama Series Primetime Emmy Award winners
People of Lazian descent
People of Sicilian descent
People of Calabrian descent
American people of Italian descent
Lee Strasberg Theatre and Film Institute alumni
Living people
American male taekwondo practitioners
Male actors from New York (state)
Actors from Mount Vernon, New York
American podcasters